North Cinque Island or Gue-a-lue is an uninhabited island of the Andaman Islands. It belongs to the South Andaman administrative district, part of the Indian union territory of Andaman and Nicobar Islands.

Geography
The passage between North Cinque and Rutland is called Manners Strait.
North Cinque Island and South Cinque Island,  to the south, are sometimes considered to be a single Cinque Island.  
North Cinque consists of three rocky Peninsulas connected by sand bars.  The northern peninsula is the largest one, 2.9 km long in the N-S direction and 1.1 km wide; it has two adjacent hills about 154 m and 145 m high. The middle (southernmost) peninsula, 1.05 km across, lies 270 m to the south and has a bare hill 89 m high. About 150 m to its west lies the third and smallest peninsula, an oval knob about 450 m across. 
The sand bar between the south and north peninsulas was broken through in the 2004 Indian Ocean earthquake and tsunami but has since reformed.

Administration
Politically, North Cinque Island is part of Port Blair Taluk.

Demographics 
There was a wildlife station on the island, but it was abandoned after budget cuts at 2011. 
There is a lighthouse at the top of the tallest hill on the northern part of North Cinque, established 1972, about 2 km from the landing point.

Fauna
The Cinque Islands have been declared a sanctuary as they house an enormous variety of coral reefs, sea weeds, colorful fishes, shells, starfish, sea anemones, salt-water crocodile, turtles and water snakes.

Tourism 
The island is a popular destination for underwater diving. It is best known for its coral richness and beach beauty.
It was named as one of the most visited locations of Andamans.

References 

Cities and towns in South Andaman district
Islands of South Andaman district
Tourist attractions in the Andaman and Nicobar Islands
Uninhabited islands of India
Islands of India
Islands of the Bay of Bengal